James Allison (born 21 February 1968) is an English motorsport designer and engineer, best known for his accomplishments in Formula 1, where he was the chief technical officer  of Mercedes-AMG Petronas F1 Team until July 2021 before rejoining the team in January 2023.

Early life
Born in Louth, Lincolnshire, the son of former Royal Air Force officer, Air Chief Marshal Sir John Allison, James was educated at Abingdon School and Cambridge.

Career

Benetton, Larrousse, and Ferrari: 1991–2005
After graduating from Cambridge in 1991, Allison joined the aerodynamics department of the Benetton Formula One team. After a couple of years at Benetton he moved to Larrousse as head of aerodynamics before returning to Benetton as head of aerodynamics in the mid-1990s. In 2000, he moved to Ferrari for five years.

Renault/Lotus: 2005–2013
Allison returned to Benetton (by then known as Renault F1) in the role of deputy technical director in 2005. In 2009 Allison became technical director. In 2011, Renault F1 became Lotus Renault GP, before becoming Lotus F1 in 2012.

Return to Ferrari: 2013–2016

On 8 May 2013, Allison quit as Lotus F1 Team technical director to be replaced by Nick Chester. On 29 July 2013, Allison rejoined Ferrari as chassis technical director and then technical director until July 2016. On 27 July 2016, Allison quit as Scuderia Ferrari technical director following the death of his wife.

Mercedes AMG: 2017–present
On 16 February 2017 Mercedes-AMG Petronas Motorsport announced that Allison was to join the team in the newly created role of technical director, following the departure of Paddy Lowe to Williams Grand Prix Engineering.

Mercedes AMG & INEOS Britannia: 2021–present
In April 2021 Allison became Chief Technical Officer of Mercedes AMG.

On 4 October 2021, it was announced that Allison would take on a new Chief Technical Officer role at Ineos Team UK Britannia America's Cup Team. This new role will position Allison as technical lead of Ben Ainslie's campaign for the 37th America's Cup, with Mercedes-AMG F1 Applied Science partnering with their existing sailing and design teams, which include Ainslie, Giles Scott, and prominent naval architect and yacht designer Martin Fischer.

Formula One Championships
Allison-designed cars have won the following Formula One World Constructors' Championships and World Drivers' Championships:

See also
 List of Old Abingdonians

References

Formula One designers
Living people
1968 births
Ferrari people
People educated at Abingdon School
Mercedes-Benz in Formula One
Benetton Formula